The Jono Project was a satirical news and entertainment show hosted by Jono Pryor. The show aired in New Zealand on Monday nights, on C4 in 2010, then TV3 in 2011. The show combined pre-filmed sketches, pranks and parodies linked together by segments filmed in front of a small studio audience; and was preceded by Jono's New Show. The show also included Guy Williams and Shannon Ryan. When season 2 ended, the show was not renewed. However, MediaWorks decided to merge The Jono Project with WANNA-BEn (a sketch show hosted by Ben Boyce), which led to the creation of Jono and Ben at Ten (later renamed Jono and Ben).

References

External links 
 The Jono Project - Official Page

2010s New Zealand television series
2010 New Zealand television series debuts
2011 New Zealand television series endings
C4 (New Zealand TV channel) original programming
English-language television shows
New Zealand satirical television shows
Television shows filmed in New Zealand
Television shows funded by NZ on Air
Three (TV channel) original programming